Lov Kumar Grover (born 1961) is an Indian-American computer scientist. He is the originator of the Grover database search algorithm used in quantum computing.  Grover's 1996 algorithm won renown as the second major algorithm proposed for quantum computing (after Shor's 1994 algorithm), and in 2017 was finally implemented in a scalable physical quantum system.  Grover's algorithm has been the subject of numerous popular science articles.

Grover received his bachelor's degree from the Indian Institute of Technology, Delhi in 1981 and his PhD in Electrical engineering from Stanford University in 1985. In 1984, he went to Bell Laboratories.  He worked as a visiting professor at Cornell University from 1987 to 1994. He retired in 2008 becoming an independent researcher.

Publications
 Grover L.K.: A fast quantum mechanical algorithm for database search, Proceedings, 28th Annual ACM Symposium on the Theory of Computing, (May 1996) p. 212
 Grover L.K.: From Schrödinger's equation to quantum search algorithm, American Journal of Physics, 69(7): 769–777, 2001. Pedagogical review of the algorithm and its history.
 Grover L.K.: Quantum Computing: How the weird logic of the subatomic world could make it possible for machines to calculate millions of times faster than they do today The Sciences, July/August 1999, pp. 24–30.
 What's a Quantum Phone Book?, Lov Grover, Lucent Technologies

References

Living people
Theoretical computer scientists
Indian computer scientists
American computer scientists
Scientists at Bell Labs
1961 births
IIT Delhi alumni
Quantum information scientists
Indian emigrants to the United States